Methyl vinyl ketone (MVK, IUPAC name: butenone) is the organic compound with the formula CH3C(O)CH=CH2. It is a reactive compound classified as an enone, in fact the simplest example thereof.  It is a colorless, flammable, highly toxic liquid with a pungent odor.  It is soluble in water and polar organic solvents.  It is a useful intermediate in the synthesis of other compounds.

Production
MVK has been prepared industrially by the condensation of acetone and formaldehyde, followed by dehydration.  Similarly it is prepared by the Mannich reaction involving diethylammonium chloride and acetone, which produces the Mannich adduct:
CH3C(O)CH3 + CH2O + [H2NEt2]Cl → [CH3C(O)CH2CH2N(H)Et2]Cl + H2O

Heating this ammonium salt releases the ammonium chloride and the MVK:
[CH3C(O)CH2CH2N(H)Et2]Cl   →   CH3C(O)CH=CH2  +  [H2NEt2]Cl

Reactivity and applications
MVK can act as an alkylating agent because it is an effective Michael acceptor.  It gained early attention for its use in the Robinson annulation, a method useful in the preparation of steroids:

Its alkylating ability is both the source of its high toxicity and the feature that makes it a useful intermediate in organic synthesis.  MVK will polymerize spontaneously.  The compound is typically stored with hydroquinone, which inhibits polymerization.  

As an electrophilic alkene, it forms an adduct with cyclopentadiene.  The resulting norbornene derivative is an intermediate in the synthesis of the anticholinergic drug biperiden.  Via its cyanohydrin is also a precursor to vinclozolin.  It is also a precursor to synthetic vitamin A.

MVK is an intermediate in the synthesis of some pharmaceutical drugs including etorphine, buprenorphine, tolquinzole, butaclamol, and etretinate.

Safety
MVK is extremely hazardous upon inhalation causing coughing, wheezing and shortness of breath even at low concentrations.  It will also readily cause irritation of the skin, eyes, and mucous membranes.

References

External links
 NJ Hazardous Substance Factsheet for methyl vinyl ketone
 MSDS for methyl vinyl ketone
 Compilation of Henry's law constants for inorganic and organic species of potential importance in environmental chemistry. Sander, R. 1999-04-08.

Alkylating agents
Vinyl compounds
Enones
Pulmonary agents